Butuan Polysports Complex, is a sports complex of the Philippines located at Barangay Tiniwisan, Butuan and is the venue of athletic events of both Agusan del Norte and Caraga region. There are only 3 sport venues which was completed. They are: Polysports Basketball Arena, Polysports Football Stadium, and the Polysports Baseball Park prior to the 19th Caraga Regional Athletic Meet (or CRAM 2016). As of November 16, 2019; only the Football Stadium remains active.

Construction
The sports complex was started in 2012 when the old sports complex in Libertad was unfinished.

Controversy
In November 2015, J.D. Legaspi had expired the mayor's permit, according to the COA. In December 2015, the previous mayor probed for plunder and graft over P253,000,000 sports complex contract.  However, in February 2016, the previous mayor ordered to arrest 43 Brgy. Captains for perjury and vexation and the connection of the polysports complex contract. In April 2016, 3 out of 43 Brgy. Captains were arrested by the local police for using drugs, and illegal possession of firearms and ammunition. As of now, only the rubberized track oval, football field, and the basketball gymnasium have been completed so far, however; Former Mayor Jun Amante and the establishment are still investigated by Commission on Audit and its still cannot be used and at the moment.

Sporting Events

Athletics
The Polysports Complex hosted the Pinoyathletics competition Battle of Butuan on April 24, 2021. The 100 dash lane will using 7 lanes, as lane 1 is overgrown by grass and unusable, and also the track oval is oversized at 415m, and its very difficult to accurate lane measurements.

The Polysports Complex once again hosted the Pinoyathletics competition Mindanao Track League on unscheduled date of May, and once again its Leg 3 on December 4, 2021.

Others
The Polysports Complex hosted the 2016 Caraga Regional Athletic Meet in which the Butuan City Team wins overall.

Facilities

Gallery

See also
Butuan
List of indoor arenas in the Philippines
List of football stadiums in the Philippines
List of baseball stadiums in the Philippines

References

External links

Sports complexes in the Philippines
Buildings and structures in Butuan
Baseball venues in the Philippines
Football venues in the Philippines